Mroum is a khum (commune) in Angkor Chey District, Kampot Province, Cambodia.

Administration 
As of 2020, Mroum Commune has 6 phums (villages) as follows.

References 

Kampot province
Communes of Kampot Province